Zbigniew Kania (born 17 March 1951) is a Polish sailor. He competed in the Flying Dutchman event at the 1972 Summer Olympics.

References

External links
 

1951 births
Living people
Polish male sailors (sport)
Olympic sailors of Poland
Sailors at the 1972 Summer Olympics – Flying Dutchman
People from Płońsk County